Paul Rutherford (born 8 December 1959) is an English singer, musician and dancer. He is best known as the dancer, keyboardist, and backing vocalist of the synth-pop band Frankie Goes to Hollywood.

Early life 

Rutherford was born on 8 December 1959 in Liverpool, but moved to the Cantril Farm district as a child during the 1960s. He attended St Dominic's Roman Catholic school in Huyton along with his twin sister.

Career 

Rutherford emerged from the 1970s punk scene on Merseyside, finding initial fame with St. Helen's band The Spitfire Boys. The Spitfire Boys released a single "British Refugees/Mein Kampf".

Rutherford later teamed up with Holly Johnson in a new band which went on to dominate the UK Singles Chart in 1984.

He frequented and performed at the Seven Dials Jazz Club in London.

Frankie Goes to Hollywood 

Rutherford joined Frankie Goes to Hollywood in 1980. He sang backing vocals to Johnson and also danced and provided some keyboard parts to the band's recordings. The band ended three years later, and Rutherford attempted a solo career which was short-lived.

After Frankie Goes to Hollywood 

In 1989, three singles, and the album Oh World were released. Two of the album tracks were produced by Martin Fry and Mark White of ABC.

Rutherford's 1988 "Get Real", a collaboration with ABC, reached No. 47 in the UK and remained in the charts for four weeks.

In late 2010, he released the album "The Cowboy Years" under the name "Paul Rutherford/Butt Cowboys".

Personal life 

Rutherford and his civil union partner Perry live in New Zealand.

Discography

Solo albums 

 Oh World (1989)
 The Cowboy Years (2010)

Extended plays 

 That Moon with The Pressure Zone (1989)

Singles 

 "Get Real" (1988)
 "I Want Your Love" (1989)
 "Oh World" (1989)

References

External links 

 
 
 The Cowboy Years at iTunes

1959 births
English male singers
Frankie Goes to Hollywood members
British LGBT singers
Living people
Musicians from Liverpool
English gay musicians
British expatriates in New Zealand
20th-century LGBT people
21st-century LGBT people